Liu Yaxin (born 16 June 1999) is a Chinese competitive swimmer who specializes in backstroke.

She qualified for the 2016 Summer Olympics in Rio de Janeiro in the 200 meter backstroke. She swam the 4th time in the semifinals and reached the final, where she finished 7th.

At the 2015 World Aquatics Championships in Kazan she finished 18th in the 200 meter backstroke.

On 19 August 2018 Liu won the Women's 200M Backstroke at the 2018 Asian Games in Jakarta, Indonesia.

References

1999 births
Living people
Chinese female backstroke swimmers
Olympic swimmers of China
Swimmers at the 2016 Summer Olympics
Asian Games medalists in swimming
Swimmers at the 2018 Asian Games
Asian Games gold medalists for China
Medalists at the 2018 Asian Games
Swimmers at the 2020 Summer Olympics
Medalists at the FINA World Swimming Championships (25 m)
21st-century Chinese women